Craig Davidson (born 1975) is a Canadian author of short stories and novels, who has published work under both his own name and the pen names Patrick Lestewka and Nick Cutter. His style has been compared to that of Chuck Palahniuk.

Early life

Born in Toronto, Ontario, he was raised in Calgary and St. Catharines.  Davidson attended both Trent University and the University of New Brunswick.

Career

His first short story collection, Rust and Bone, was later published in September 2005 by Penguin Books Canada, and was a finalist for the 2006 Danuta Gleed Literary Award. Stories in Rust and Bone have also been adapted into a play by Australian playwright Caleb Lewis and a Golden Globe-nominated film by French director Jacques Audiard.

Davidson also released a novel in 2007 named The Fighter. During the course of his research of the novel, Davidson went on a 16-week steroid cycle. To promote the release of the novel, Davidson participated in a fully sanctioned boxing match against Toronto poet Michael Knox at Florida Jack's Boxing Gym; for the novel's subsequent release in the United States, his publisher organized a similar promotional boxing match against Jonathan Ames. Davidson lost both matches.

His 2013 novel Cataract City was named as a shortlisted nominee for the 2013 Scotiabank Giller Prize.

In addition to his literary fiction, Davidson has also published several works of horror literature using the pseudonyms Patrick Lestewka and Nick Cutter. In 2014, he released the thriller novel The Troop, with The Deep following in 2015.

In 2018, his memoir Precious Cargo, about a year spent driving a bus for disabled children in Calgary, was a finalist for Canada Reads.

His 2018 novel The Saturday Night Ghost Club was a shortlisted finalist for the Rogers Writers' Trust Fiction Prize and was an American Booksellers Association Indie Next Great Reads selection in July 2019. This novel tells the story of a young boy who is coming-to-age while spending Saturdays catching ghosts with his eccentric Uncle Calvin. It explores themes of grief, depression, family, friendship, and growing into adulthood.

Davidson's work has received acclaim from notable authors such as Stephen King, Scott Smith and Jonathan Maberry.

Bibliography
Rust and Bone (2005)
The Fighter (2008)
Sarah Court (2010)
Cataract City (2013) (shortlisted for the 2013 Scotiabank Giller Prize)
Precious Cargo (2016)
The Saturday Night Ghost Club (2018)
Cascade (2020)

as Patrick Lestewka
Mother Bitchfight (2003) 
The Preserve (2004)
Imprint (2011)
The Coliseum (2011)
Vehicles (2012)

as Nick Cutter
The Troop (2014)
The Deep (2015)
The Acolyte (2015)
Little Heaven (2017)
The Breach (2020)

References

External links 
Craig Davidson

1976 births
Canadian male novelists
Living people
Canadian male short story writers
Writers from Calgary
Writers from Toronto
Trent University alumni
University of New Brunswick alumni
21st-century Canadian short story writers
21st-century Canadian male writers
21st-century Canadian novelists